Dounan Township is an urban township in Yunlin County, Taiwan.

History
The original name of Dounan is Taliwu (他里霧), which is named after one of the branches of an aboriginal tribe. The development of Taliwu had started since the Ming Dynasty, when Koxinga came to Taiwan. It is the first place explored by the Han Chinese in the Yunlin area. During the Japanese rule period, Tarimu/Taliwu was rebuilt as an administrative division under the governance of Huwei and renamed to Tonan in 1920. In 1946, it became an independent township.

Geography
Dounan is located on a plain with flat terrain. The elevation of the township is 33 meters above sea level and it inclines from east to west.

Administrative divisions
Tungren, Xiqi, Nanchang, Beiming, Zhongtian, Linzi, Shigui, Shixi, Jingxing, Xinnan, Adan, Jiangjun, Jiushe, Mingchang, Datung, Beima, Xiba, Xinlun, Tungming, Xinguang, Tiantou and Xiaotung Village.

Economy
Most of the land use in Dounan is for agriculture, which makes up about 10.4 km2. The majority of the business in the township is low-level service, in which most of them are retail stores.

Tourist attractions
 Dounan Stadium
 Yunlin County Stadium

Transportation
Dounan is the transport center for Yunlin County.

 National Freeway 1 Dounan Interchange (斗南交流道)
 Taiwan Railways Administration
 Dounan Station
 Shigui Station

References

Townships in Yunlin County